Pyrausta chrysoterma is a moth in the family Crambidae. It is found in Argentina.

References

Moths described in 1933
chrysoterma
Moths of South America